Michael Haydn's Symphony No. 16 in A major, Perger 6, Sherman 16, Sherman-adjusted 17, MH 152, was written in Salzburg in 1771. This work was at one time attributed to Joseph Haydn, the ninth work in A major so attributed in Anthony van Hoboken's catalogue.

Scored for 2 oboes, 2 bassoons, 2 horns and strings, in four movements:

Allegro molto
Minuet and Trio (in A minor)
Andante (in D major)
Allegro molto

The placement of the Minuet second, before the slow movement, is unusual in Haydn's symphonies, though there is one other specimen, Symphony No. 15, which scholars are fairly certain is a close contemporary to this one. Three symphonies by brother Joseph Haydn also have this placement, 32, 37 and 44.

The corresponding placement of the Scherzo second in the Romantic era, despite Ludwig van Beethoven's Symphony No. 9, was rare until Anton Bruckner's Eighth and Ninth Symphonies and Gustav Mahler's First, Fourth and Sixth Symphonies.

Discography 

This work is included in a set of 20 symphonies on the CPO label with Bohdan Warchal conducting the Slovak Philharmonic, on disc 4. It is also available in a performance by the London Mozart Players conducted by Matthias Bamert on the Chandos label, the Capella Savaria conducted by Pál Németh on the Hungaroton label, and the Franz Liszt Kammerorchester conducted by János Rolla on Teldec.

References
 Charles H. Sherman and T. Donley Thomas, Johann Michael Haydn (1737 - 1806), a chronological thematic catalogue of his works. Stuyvesant, New York: Pendragon Press (1993)
 C. Sherman, "Johann Michael Haydn" in The Symphony: Salzburg, Part 2 London: Garland Publishing (1982): lxv

Symphony 16
Compositions in A major
1771 compositions